The 2018 Austrian Open was the twelfth event of the 2018 ITTF World Tour. The event was organised by the Austrian Table Tennis Association, under the authority of the International Table Tennis Federation (ITTF). It was the last Platinum event on the tour, and took place from 8–11 November in Linz, Austria.

Men's singles

Seeds

Draw

Top half

Bottom half

Finals

Women's singles

Seeds

Draw

Top half

Bottom half

Finals

Men's doubles

Seeds

Draw

Women's doubles

Seeds

Draw

Mixed doubles

Seeds

Draw

References

External links
Tournament page on ITTF website

Austrian Open
Austrian Open (table tennis)
Table tennis competitions in Austria
International sports competitions hosted by Austria
Austrian Open (table tennis)